Argo Racing Cars Ltd. is a British racing constructor founded by Swiss designer Jo Marquart and British mechanic Nick Jordan as part of their Anglia Cars racing team in the 1980s. The company initially constructed a variety of open-wheel cars for national and international Formula Three, as well as the Formula Atlantic and Formula Super Vee series. The company later built sports prototypes for the World Sportscar Championship's C2 class and the North American IMSA GT Championship's IMSA Lights category, winning several championships.

Argo produced in excess of 100 chassis between 1983 and 1993. Production included 7 JM16 and 19 JM19 sports prototype chassis.

Argo Racing Cars was later purchased by David Sears and the former headquarters now houses his Super Nova Racing team.

The Argo Racing Cars name was resurrected in later years for use in the A1 Grand Prix championship, where they supported A1 Team Lebanon and A1 Team India.

Sources 
A1 Team Lebanon moves technical team for new season of A1GP

References

External links 
 A1 Team Lebanon Official Site
 A1 Team India Official Site

 

World Sportscar Championship teams
British racecar constructors